Timing is the tracking or planning of the spacing of events in time. It may refer to:

 Timekeeping, the process of measuring the passage of time
 Synchronization, controlling the timing of a process relative to another process
 Time metrology, the measurement of time

Timing in different fields
 Timing (comedy), use of rhythm, tempo and pausing to enhance comedy and humour
 Timing (linguistics), rhythmic division of time into equal portions by a language
 Timing (music), ability to "keep time" accurately and to synchronise to an ensemble
 Color timing, photochemical process of altering and enhancing the color of an image
 Ignition timing, timing of piston and crankshaft so that a spark will occur near the end of the compression stroke
 Market timing, by attempting to predict future market price movements
 Memory timings (or RAM timings), measure of the performance of DRAM memory
 Valve timing, the precise timing of the opening and closing of the valves in a piston engine

Time